Rómulo Parés (20 March 1925 – 28 January 2000) was an Argentine boxer. He competed in the men's bantamweight event at the 1952 Summer Olympics.

References

External links
 

1925 births
2000 deaths
Argentine male boxers
Olympic boxers of Argentina
Boxers at the 1952 Summer Olympics
Place of birth missing
Bantamweight boxers